Tanzania competed at the 2019 African Games held from 19 to 31 August 2019 in Rabat, Morocco. Athletes representing Tanzania competed in two sports, athletics and judo, and did not win any medals.

Athletics 

Tanzania competed in several events in athletics.

Ali Khamis Gulam and Benjamini Michael Kulwa competed in the men's 200 metres and men's 400 metres events.

Regina Deogratius Mpigachai competed in the women's 800 metres event. She competed in the heats and did not advance to compete in the final.

Gabriel Gerald Geay competed in the men's 1500 metres. He was also scheduled to compete in the men's 5000 metres event but he did not start.

Natalia Elisante Sulle and Sara Ramadhani competed in the women's half marathon event. Sulle finished in 7th place and Ramadhani did not finish.

Judo 

Three athletes represented Tanzania in judo:

References 

Nations at the 2019 African Games
2019
African Games